Martins is a small crater on Mercury.  Its name was adopted by the International Astronomical Union (IAU) in 2019. Martins is named for the Brazilian sculptor Maria Martins.

The bright features in and around Martins crater may be hollows.

References

Impact craters on Mercury